Dreaming of You is the International studio album by Filipino singer Juris on September 21, 2012 in Singapore by S2S Pte. Ltd. and on August 5, 2013 in the Philippines by Star Records in CD format and in digital download through iTunes and Amazon.com.

Background
Dreaming Of You was initially released in Singapore, containing only 12 English tracks. It topped the jazz chart of Singapore’s popular music store HMV. Also, made it to the list of top albums in iTunes Thailand and was one of the featured albums in iTunes Asia. The Dreaming Of You (Philippines Deluxe Edition) contains 19 tracks that features additional OPM songs, mostly TV and Movie theme songs sung by Juris.

Track listing

References

2012 albums
2013 albums
Juris Fernandez albums